Saint Phillip's, also known as Ffryes, or Simpson is a town in Saint Philip Parish, Antigua and Barbuda.

Demographics 
Saint Philip's has one enumeration district.

 61400 St. Phillips

Census Data

References

Saint Philip Parish, Antigua and Barbuda
Populated places in Antigua and Barbuda